LogP may refer to:

 Partition coefficient, the name of a ratio in organic and medicinal chemistry.
 LogP machine, a model for parallel computation.